Granat Skarżysko-Kamienna is one of the oldest football clubs in Świętokrzyskie Voivodeship. The most famous footballer brought up in this club was Arkadiusz Bilski, who transferred to Korona Kielce. In the past, the stadium's capacity was 25,000, but modernisation reduced the capacity by 5000. Granat's most successful season was second place in third division in 1992/93 season.

Football clubs in Poland
Skarżysko County
Football clubs in Świętokrzyskie Voivodeship
Association football clubs established in 1928
1928 establishments in Poland